Events in the year 2015 in Ecuador.

Incumbents 
 President: Rafael Correa
 Vice President: Jorge Glas

Events 
May 30-31 - The 2015 South American Junior Championships in Athletics are held in Cuenca.
June 8 - 2015 Ecuadorian protests: Public protests escalate against the government of Rafael Correa.

Arts and culture

Sports 
2015 Ecuador Open Quito
Ecuador at the 2015 World Championships in Athletics

Deaths
December 21 – Richelieu Levoyer, 85, military commander and politician

References

External links 

 
2010s in Ecuador
Years of the 21st century in Ecuador
Ecuador
Ecuador